Daryl Carter is a former linebacker in the National Football League. He was a member of the Chicago Bears during the 1997 NFL season.

References

1975 births
Players of American football from Milwaukee
Chicago Bears players
American football linebackers
Wisconsin Badgers football players
Living people